Elections to Stevenage Council in Hertfordshire, England were held on 1 May 2003. One third of the council was up for election; the seats of the candidates who finished first in each ward in the all-out election of 1999. The Labour Party stayed in overall control of the council, as had been predicted before the election. Overall turnout was 52.2%.

After the election, the composition of the council was:
Labour 33
Liberal Democrat 3
Conservative 3

Election result

Ward results

Bandley Hill

Bedwell

Chells

Longmeadow

Manor

Martins Wood

Old Town

Pin Green

Roebuck

St Nicholas

Shephall

Symonds Green

Woodfield

References
2003 Stevenage election result
Ward results
Chapter 30 Hertfordshire

2003
2003 English local elections
2000s in Hertfordshire